Bowcott is a surname. Notable people with the surname include:

 Harry Bowcott (1907–2004), Welsh international rugby union player
 Sidney Bowcott (1881–1963), British-born Canadian politician